Robert William Hackett, Jr. (born August 16, 1959) is an American former competition swimmer, Olympic medalist, and former world record-holder.  He represented the United States at the 1976 Summer Olympics in Montreal, Quebec as a 16-year-old, where he won a silver medal in the men's 1500-meter freestyle, finishing behind U.S. teammate Brian Goodell.

He was trained by coach Joe Bernal.  Bernal, the former head coach of Bernal's Gator Swim Club in Boston, Massachusetts, was known to have given Hackett 100 x 100 yard sets on the 1:00 interval.  Hackett still holds one of the oldest National Age Group records, a 15:03.91 in the 1,500-meter freestyle (long-course meters).  He set the record by shattering the previous record at the 1976 Olympics.

As of 2012, Hackett was living and working in the New York metro area, near where he grew up. He has made a living in commercial real estate and is volunteer coaching with the Boys and Girls Club of Northern Westchester Marlins.  He earned an MBA from Harvard Business School in 1986. Hackett now coaches part-time for Emory University's swimming and diving team.

See also
 List of Harvard University people
 List of Olympic medalists in swimming (men)
 List of World Aquatics Championships medalists in swimming (men)
 World record progression 800 metres freestyle
 World record progression 4 × 200 metres freestyle relay

References

External links
 

1959 births
Living people
American male freestyle swimmers
World record setters in swimming
Harvard Crimson men's swimmers
Olympic silver medalists for the United States in swimming
Pan American Games bronze medalists for the United States
Pan American Games gold medalists for the United States
Sportspeople from Yonkers, New York
Swimmers at the 1975 Pan American Games
Swimmers at the 1976 Summer Olympics
Swimmers at the 1979 Pan American Games
World Aquatics Championships medalists in swimming
Medalists at the 1976 Summer Olympics
Pan American Games silver medalists for the United States
Pan American Games medalists in swimming
Fordham Preparatory School alumni
Medalists at the 1975 Pan American Games
Medalists at the 1979 Pan American Games
Harvard Business School alumni